Film has been the most influential medium in the presentation of the history of slavery to the general public.  The American film industry has had a complex relationship with slavery, and until recent decades often avoided the topic. Films such as The Birth of a Nation (1915) and Gone with the Wind (1939) became controversial because they gave a favorable depiction. In 1940, The Santa Fe Trail gave a strong condemnation of abolitionist John Brown's attacks on slavery. The American civil rights movement in the 1950s made defiant slaves into heroes.

Most Hollywood films used American settings, although  Spartacus (1960) dealt with an actual slave revolt in the Roman Empire known as the Third Servile War. It failed, and all the rebels were executed, but their spirit lived on according to the film.  The Last Supper (La última cena in Spanish) was a 1976 film directed by Cuban Tomás Gutiérrez Alea about the teaching of Christianity to slaves in Cuba and emphasizes the role of ritual and revolt.  The 1969 film Burn! takes place on the imaginary Portuguese island of Queimada (where the locals speak Spanish) and merges historical events that took place in Brazil, Cuba, Santo Domingo, Jamaica, and elsewhere.

List of films

The following dramatic and documentary films featuring slavery are listed alphabetically. (For movies portraying penal labour see the list linked from here.)

See also
 Underground (2016 TV series)
 Blaxploitation and Slavesploitation
 List of blaxploitation films
 Rosewood (film), 1997 film by John Singleton

References

Films featuring slavery, List of
Films featuring slavery, List of
Slavery, Films featuring
films